Meriame Terchoun (born 27 October 1995) is an Algerian-Swiss footballer who plays for Dijon in the French Division 1 Féminine and for the Switzerland national team.

Career
The daughter of a former footballer, Terchoun plays club football for FC Zürich. After suffering a knee injury at age 24, she returned to lead her club to a domestic league and cup double.

Terchoun also is a representative of the Swiss Association of Football Players.

Honours 
FC Zürich
Winner
 Nationalliga A (6): 2013, 2014, 2015, 2016, 2018, 2022,
 Swiss Women's Cup (5): 2013, 2015, 2016, 2018, 2022,

References

External links 
 

1995 births
Living people
Swiss women's footballers
Switzerland women's international footballers
Women's association football forwards
Swiss people of Algerian descent
Swiss sportspeople of African descent
FC Zürich Frauen players
Swiss Women's Super League players
FC Basel Frauen players
Sportspeople from Lausanne
UEFA Women's Euro 2022 players
UEFA Women's Euro 2017 players
Swiss expatriate sportspeople in France
Expatriate women's footballers in France
Swiss expatriate women's footballers